Jonathan Top (born January 26, 1993) is an American former soccer player.

Early life
Top is the son of a Mexican mother and a Guatemalan father. He has three siblings: two sisters and one brother. Top attended North Side High School in Fort Worth, Texas, where he played football and soccer. Top graduated in 2011.

Career
On January 12, 2011, Top signed with FC Dallas as the club's fifth Homegrown Player. On April 25, 2012, Top made his professional debut for the club in a 1-1 draw at home against Real Salt Lake.

References

External links
 

1993 births
Living people
American people of Guatemalan descent
American sportspeople of North American descent
Sportspeople of Guatemalan descent
American soccer players
American sportspeople of Mexican descent
Association football forwards
Comunicaciones F.C. players
FC Dallas players
Guatemalan footballers
Homegrown Players (MLS)
Major League Soccer players
Phoenix Rising FC players
Soccer players from Texas
Sportspeople from Fort Worth, Texas
United States men's under-20 international soccer players
USL Championship players